The Men's Team Racing Laser Standard is a sailing event on the Sailing at the Southeast Asian Games programme at the National Sailing Centre.

Schedule
All times are Singapore Standard Time (UTC+08:00)

Results

Preliminary round

Knockout round

References

Men's Match Team Racing Laser Standard
Laser (dinghy) competitions